Dorcadion suvorovi is a species of beetle in the family Cerambycidae. It was described by Jakovlev in 1906.

Subspecies
 Dorcadion suvorovi karachokensis Danilevsky, 1996
 Dorcadion suvorovi konyrolenus Danilevsky, 1996
 Dorcadion suvorovi suvorovi Jakovlev, 1906
 Dorcadion suvorovi taldykurganus Danilevsky, 1996
 Dorcadion suvorovi tekeliensis Danilevsky, 1996

See also 
 Dorcadion

References

suvorovi
Beetles described in 1906